James "Buddy" MacEachern (June 29, 1940 – June 15, 2018) was a Canadian politician from Nova Scotia. He represented the electoral district of Cape Breton Centre in the Nova Scotia House of Assembly from 1974 to 1981. He was a member of the Nova Scotia New Democratic Party.

Life
MacEachern was born on June 29, 1940, at Sydney, Nova Scotia. He was a Catholic.

In the 1974 provincial election, MacEachern defeated Progressive Conservative incumbent Mike Laffin to win the Cape Breton Centre riding. He was re-elected in the 1978 election, and in 1980 became the party's interim leader following the resignation of Jeremy Akerman. He served for a month until a leadership convention elected Alexa McDonough as leader. At the convention, MacEachern was also a candidate, finishing third. In the 1981 election, MacEachern was defeated by the riding's former MLA, Mike Laffin.

MacEachern died on June 15, 2018, in Dartmouth, Nova Scotia.

References

 

1940 births
2018 deaths
Canadian people of Scottish descent
Canadian Roman Catholics
Leaders of the Nova Scotia CCF/NDP
Nova Scotia New Democratic Party MLAs
People from Sydney, Nova Scotia